Henri Garat (born Henri Garascu; 3 April 1902 in Paris – 13 August 1959) was a French actor and singer of Romanian origin.

Selected filmography
The Road to Paradise (1930)
Our Masters, the Servants (1930)
 The Girl and the Boy (1931)
 Princess, At Your Orders! (1931)
 Caught in the Act (1931)
Delphine (1931)
 Students in Paris (1932)
 Congress Dances (1932)
 A Star Disappears (1932)
 He Is Charming (1932)
 The Midnight Prince (1934)
 A Man Has Been Stolen (1934)
 Royal Waltz (1936)
 Counsel for Romance (1936)
 Chaste Susanne (1937)
 The Girl in the Taxi (1937)
 In the Sun of Marseille (1938)
 Annette and the Blonde Woman (1942)
 Madly in Love (1943)

References

External links 
 
 Henri Garat on "Du Temps des Cerises aux Feuilles Mortes (in french)

1902 births
1959 deaths
Male actors from Paris
French male film actors
French people of Romanian descent
Musicians from Paris
Burials at Père Lachaise Cemetery
20th-century French male actors
20th-century French male singers